Imagery is visual symbolism, or figurative language that evokes a mental image or other kinds of sense impressions, especially in a literary work, but also in other activities such as psychotherapy.

Forms
There are five major types of sensory imagery, each corresponding to a sense, feeling, action, or reaction:

 Visual imagery pertains to graphics, visual scenes, pictures, or the sense of sight.
Auditory imagery pertains to sounds, noises, music, or the sense of hearing. (This kind of imagery may come in the form of onomatopoeia).
Olfactory imagery pertains to odors, aromas, scents, or the sense of smell.
Gustatory imagery pertains to flavors or the sense of taste.
Tactile imagery pertains to physical textures or the sense of touch.

Other types of imagery include:

Kinesthetic imagery pertains to movements.
Organic imagery / subjective imagery, pertains to personal experiences of a character's body, including emotion and the senses of hunger, thirst, fatigue, and pain.
Phenomenological, pertains to the mental conception of an item as opposed to the physical version.
Color imagery is the ability to visualize a color in its absence

References

Further reading

External links
 
 

Fiction
Style (fiction)
Literature
Narrative techniques